Skarvelis or Scarvelis is a Greek surname. Notable people with the surname include:

 Kostas Skarvelis (Greek: Κώστας Σκαρβέλης; 1880–1942), Greek composer of the rembetiko (ρεμπέτικο) genre
 Nicholas Scarvelis (Greek: Νικόλαος Σκαρβέλης; born 1993), American-born Greek athlete
 Nikolaos Skarvelis (Greek: Νικόλαος Σκαρβέλης;), Commander of the Athens Infantry in the 3 September 1843 Revolution
 Stamatia Scarvelis (Greek: Σταματία Σκαρβέλη; born 1995), American-born Greek athlete

Greek-language surnames